The Oneone River is a short river of the West Coast Region of New Zealand's South Island. It is located northwest of Harihari, and reaches the Tasman Sea at the estuary of its larger northern neighbour, the Wanganui River.

The New Zealand Ministry for Culture and Heritage gives a translation of "earth" for Oneone.

See also
List of rivers of New Zealand

References

Rivers of the West Coast, New Zealand
Rivers of New Zealand
Westland District